Syed Shujaat Ali Hasnie (born 1905) was a Pakistani banker who served as the third Governor of the State Bank of Pakistan.

Born in 1905, Hasnie did his M.Sc (Hons) from the University of the Punjab in 1927.

Hasnie served in various positions as a civil servant in British India and later in Pakistan before becoming the Governor, State Bank of Pakistan. General Ayub Khan inaugurated the new State Bank of Pakistan building in Karachi during his tenure on 4 November 1961.

References

Governors of the State Bank of Pakistan
1905 births
Year of death missing
University of the Punjab alumni